Cornwall is a Canadian town located in Queens County, Prince Edward Island. The town is located immediately west of the provincial capital Charlottetown.

History
The community of Cornwall traces its history to European settlement in the 18th century and was a predominantly farming community until the construction of Route 1, the Trans-Canada Highway, during the early 1910s. Several subdivisions were created near the intersection of the new highway with the Meadowbank Road, along with a small commercial strip.

On April 1, 1995, the incorporated communities of Cornwall, Eliot River, and North River amalgamated to form the Town of Cornwall.

The amalgamation did not see many controversies. The name of the community of Cornwall survived although the legislation designated the new town as Charlottetown West but amid the call of some residents for a new community name, as was occurring in the case of Stratford (also amalgamated at the same time as Charlottetown South), the community decided to rename the town Cornwall once again.

Demographics 

Education
The town of Cornwall is home to three English Language School Board schools: 
 Westwood Primary School
 Eliot River Elementary School
 East Wiltshire Junior High
Students graduate East Wiltshire and go on to attend Bluefield High School in Hampshire for grades 10 to 12.

Economy
The town established the Cornwall Business Park in 1997.

Notable people 
Jared Connaughton, sprinter, Olympian, 2005 Canada Games gold medalist 100m & 200m
Adam McQuaid, NHL hockey player, Stanley Cup Champion 2011

References

External links

Communities in Queens County, Prince Edward Island
Towns in Prince Edward Island